Princes Risborough station is a railway station on the Chiltern Main Line that serves the town of Princes Risborough in Buckinghamshire, England. It is operated by Chiltern Railways.

History
At one period there were four different railway routes from the northern end of Princes Risborough station, although there has only ever been one to the south.

The cost of construction of the station building was £1104 9s 5d and additional general costs were £824 8s 0d. The station building as built was a typical Wycombe railway design with an open porch at the right hand end on the platform elevation, the design was the same as West Wycombe, Bledlow and Wheatley, and also on the original part of the Wycombe railway Cookham, Marlow Road, Wooburn Green and Loudwater. The Wycombe Railway was worked by the Great Western Railway, and was absorbed by that railway in 1867.

The Watlington and Princes Risborough Railway opened its line on 15 August 1872; that railway became part of the GWR on 1 January 1884.

The original station building was located a few hundred yards further north than the present site. The original building was extended at the north end to provide extra office accommodation between 1870 and 1880, and a curved roof canopy covering the platform may have also been added at the same time. Further additions to the building were made between 1894 and 1896.

A second platform was added when the Watlington branch was opened in 1872 although there was only a single track between the two platforms. In 1892 a new signal box was brought into use and a new passing loop, so the second platform was rebuilt with two tracks between them. A footbridge was also provided at this time.

The Great Western & Great Central Joint Committee was created with the dual objective of providing the Great Central Railway with a second route into London, bypassing the Metropolitan Railway; and of providing the GWR with a shorter route to the Midlands. Continuing in the same north-westerly direction from Ashendon Junction, the Bicester cut-off line, which was purely GWR property, was opened for goods trains on 4 April 1910, and to passengers on 1 July 1910.

The station was transferred from the Western Region of British Rail to the London Midland Region on 24 March 1974.

Chiltern Railways considered reinstating the Wycombe Railway's Oxford extension via Thame, but instead constructed a chord at Bicester to permit services to run from the main line onto the westernmost section of the Varsity Line, restored between Bicester and Oxford; this permitted a new service to Oxford which opened in 2015.

Part of the Watlington branch line has been reopened by the Chinnor and Princes Risborough Railway, which extended its heritage railway service to a new platform face at Princes Risborough station on the site of the former platform to Watlington, Platform 4; although the platform opened in August 2018, the platform as well as the Railway is still being maintained. Princes Risborough station currently has four platforms: Platform 1 for Aylesbury; Platform 2 from Aylesbury to London (via High Wycombe); Platform 3 for Bicester, Banbury, Oxford and Birmingham; and Platform 4 for the Chinnor and Princes Risborough Heritage Railway.

Originally, two through roads allowed non-stop running clear of the platform roads.  Radical cuts on the Chiltern Main Line and Great Central Main Line in the 1960s left the station with only two usable platforms - the current platforms 1 and 2.  In 1998 to increase capacity on the line Chiltern Railways reinstated platform 3, the down platform, on top of the old down platform road, in a manner similar to that at West Ruislip. Fragments of the original down platform are still visible at the station.  The 'up' through road, removed from service as part of previous drastic running-down of the route which left only two usable platforms, was restored in September 2011 as part of Chiltern's Evergreen 3 upgrade project.

Signal box

Built in 1904, Princes Risborough North Signal Box, located towards the northern end of Platform 3, is the largest surviving Great Western Railway signal box in the country. It closed in 1991 when modernisation of the line moved signalling operations to Marylebone and became a Grade II listed building after a successful public campaign to save it from demolition.

The Chinnor and Princes Risborough Railway Association were granted an agreement with National Rail allowing them to maintain the box and undertake restoration work after a period of neglect left the box damaged by weather and vandals. Work had previously ceased in 1998 due to safety concerns but was resumed in 2013.

Services and operators

The Monday to Friday off-peak service consists of:

2 trains per hour to 
1 train per hour to 

Facilities
The ticket office is staffed for most of the day Monday to Friday and on Sundays.  On Saturdays the ticket office is staffed from the morning until early afternoon.

There are two self-service ticket machines located just outside the station for use by passengers when the ticket office is closed or busy. There are also departure screens located on all three platforms and inside the waiting room.

The station has a waiting room, toilet facilities and step free access to all parts of the station: passengers reach platform 3 via lifts at either end of the footbridge. There is also a café.

Notes

References

External links

Former Great Western and Great Central Joint Railway stations
Railway stations in Buckinghamshire
DfT Category D stations
Railway stations in Great Britain opened in 1862
Railway stations served by Chiltern Railways
1862 establishments in England
Princes Risborough